Michael Bruce (born 22 November 1983) is a Scottish composer and lyricist working in theatre, television and film. He was composer-in-residence at the Donmar Warehouse theatre during Josie Rourke's artistic directorship there from 2012 to 2019.

His theatre credits include Much Ado About Nothing (2011) with David Tennant and Catherine Tate, Coriolanus (2013) with Tom Hiddleston, Twelfth Night (2017) with Tamsin Greig and Antony & Cleopatra (2018) with Ralph Fiennes, as well as the 2021 made-for-TV Romeo & Juliet with Josh O'Connor and Jessie Buckley. In 2022, he wrote original songs for the Netflix mockumentary Hard Cell.

Early life and education 

Bruce grew up in Aberdeen, Scotland and first took to the stage in Scottish Ballet's production of The Nutcracker, going on to become Highland Dancing Champion. Done with dancing, he took up table tennis in his teens, playing for the Scottish national team throughout Europe. He then studied as a singer/songwriter at Paul McCartney's Liverpool Institute for Performing Arts. It did not enroll students under the age of 18, so before that, 17-year-old Bruce spent a year honing his craft while working in a Sainsbury's near his high school, always meeting his former teachers at the checkout, who wondered what he was doing there after being one of the top academic students.

Career 
Early in his career, he worked as a musical director at the Battersea Arts Centre, the Theatre Royal Lincoln and the Edinburgh Festival Fringe, and also assisted on several national tours, cruise ships and pantomimes. In 2007, he won the Notes for The Stage competition run by the Notes from New York concert series and The Stage newspaper, which led to a concert of his musical theatre work being staged at the Apollo Theatre on Shaftesbury Avenue.

He soon got his break as the first composer-in-residence at the Bush Theatre, when its artistic director was Josie Rourke. From 2012 to 2019, he held the same position at the Donmar Warehouse, after Rourke was appointed there as Michael Grandage's successor. He wrote scores for many plays at the Donmar, including Coriolanus (2013) with Tom Hiddleston, Les Liaisons Dangereuses (2016) with Dominic West and Janet McTeer and Saint Joan (2016) with Gemma Arterton, all three shown in cinemas across the UK and internationally as part of the National Theatre Live programme, as well as BAFTA-nominated The Vote (2015) with Judi Dench, broadcast live on More4 on general election night.

His other theatre credits include Sonia Friedman's Much Ado About Nothing (2011) with David Tennant and Catherine Tate at the Wyndham's Theatre, Candide (2013), The Two Gentlemen of Verona (2014) and Timon of Athens (2018) for the Royal Shakespeare Company, Noises Off (2012) and Other Desert Cities (2014) at the Old Vic, Privacy (2016) at the Public Theater in New York and The Winslow Boy (2013) on Broadway.

Bruce has also worked on many productions at the National Theatre, including Man and Superman (2015) and Antony & Cleopatra (2018), both starring Ralph Fiennes, The Beaux' Stratagem (2015) with Samuel Barnett, Twelfth Night (2017) with Tamsin Greig and Hansard (2019) with Lindsay Duncan, all of which became parts of the National Theatre Live collection.

In 2011, he released his debut musical theatre album, Unwritten Songs, which entered the iTunes vocal chart at No. 1. He has also written a book called Writing Music for the Stage: A Practical Guide for Theatremakers, which was published by Nick Hern Books in 2016 with a foreword by Josie Rourke. Mark Gatiss called it "a must-read for all those with an interest in how music works on stage", while Judi Dench commented, "A good score makes a world of difference to an actor. Read Michael Bruce's book and you'll understand why. He is a genius."

During the COVID-19 pandemic, he wrote the soundtrack for the National Theatre's critically acclaimed first made-solely-for-TV production of Romeo & Juliet (2021), filmed in 17 days in an empty theatre with Josh O'Connor, Jessie Buckley and Tamsin Greig. It premiered on Sky Arts in the UK and PBS in the USA. He also recently wrote original songs for the Netflix mockumentary sitcom Hard Cell (2022) and the original score for The Nan Movie (2022), both starring and written by Catherine Tate.

Composing credits

Film and television

Theatre productions

Accolades

Awards 
 2007: Notes for The Stage competition run by Notes from New York and The Stage
 2009: MTM Awards – Most Promising New Musical for Ed: The Musical

Nominations 

 2009: MTM Awards – Best Lyrics for a New Musical for Ed: The Musical
 2009: MTM Awards – Best Music for a New Musical for Ed: The Musical
 2013: WhatsOnStage Awards – Best Original Music for The Recruiting Officer
 2021: Online Film & Television Association TV Awards – Best Music Composition in A Motion Picture, Limited, or Anthology for Romeo & Juliet

Publications 

 Writing Music for the Stage: A Practical Guide for Theatremakers (2016), with a foreword by Josie Rourke: 
 "Why every composer gains by writing music for plays", an article published in The Stage on 23 June 2016
 "How I wrote the music for Privacy", an article published on WhatsOnStage.com on 19 July 2016

References

External links 

 Official website
 
 

1983 births

Living people
Alumni of the Liverpool Institute for Performing Arts
21st-century British composers

21st-century composers

Scottish composers

Scottish film score composers
British composers

British lyricists

Scottish lyricists